Willie Brown (March 21, 1942 – July 26, 2018) was an American college and professional football player and coach. A star player for the University of Southern California, he went on to play three seasons in the National Football League. After his playing career, he served as a coach for the Trojans and the Tampa Bay Buccaneers of the National Football League.

Playing career
Brown  played high school football at Long Beach Polytechnic High School, where he won the California Interscholastic Federation player of the year award in 1959.

Brown went on to play college football at the University of Southern California (USC). As he was a two-way player for the Trojans, he began as a tailback and kickoff returner but also played defensive back and flanker. In 1962, he led the Trojans, who went on to win the national championship, in rushing, kickoff returns and interceptions. In 1963, as the team captain, he led the team in receiving, scoring and interceptions.

He was also a standout baseball player, who was a center fielder and shortstop for the university's baseball team that won the 1963 College World Series.

In the 1964 NFL Draft, the Los Angeles Rams selected him with the fourth pick of the third round, 32nd overall. He played two seasons with the Rams before finishing his playing career with the Philadelphia Eagles. He accumulated 133 rushing yards and 110 receiving yards in the NFL.

Coaching career
Brown returned to USC as an assistant football coach from 1968 to 1975 and helped the Trojans win national championships in 1972 and 1974. He also served as a Trojan baseball assistant in 1969 and in 1970, when USC won the 1970 College World Series.

In 1976 and 1978, he went to the Tampa Bay Buccaneers where he served as the wide receivers coach and in 1977, the team's running backs coach. In his later years, Brown was an academic monitor for USC's Student-Athlete Academic Services from 1996 to 2016.

Personal life
Brown had two brothers, Oscar and Ollie, both of whom played Major League Baseball. Ollie, who was the first pick by the San Diego Padres in the 1968 Major League Baseball expansion draft and was known as the “Original Padre”, died in 2015.

Brown died on July 26, 2018 in Carson, California from cancer.

References

External links
 

1942 births
2018 deaths
All-American college football players
Los Angeles Rams players
Sportspeople from Tuscaloosa, Alabama
African-American players of American football
Players of American football from Alabama
Philadelphia Eagles players
Tampa Bay Buccaneers coaches
USC Trojans baseball players
USC Trojans football players
Deaths from cancer in California
American football wide receivers
American football running backs